Bundesstraße 209 (B 209) is a German federal road that runs from Nienburg/Weser district in Lower Saxony to Schwarzenbek in the district of Herzogtum Lauenburg, Schleswig-Holstein.

Route 

The B 209 begins in Nienburg/Weser district between the villages of Rohrsen and Drakenburg on the B 215 and runs in a northeasterly direction past the villages of Heemsen and Anderten.

After crossing the river Aller at Rethem in Soltau-Fallingbostel district it passes through the villages of Groß Eilstorf and Kirchboitzen before entering the one-way system in the town centre of Walsrode. This is a traffic bottleneck which causes delays during the rush hour.

The B 209 then passes through Honerdingen, before reaching junction 47 on the A 7 autobahn located in Bad Fallingbostel's industrial estate.

East of Soltau by the B 71 to Munster, the B 209 then turns northeast again towards Amelinghausen and continues from there to Lüneburg. Near Artlenburg the B 209 crosses the Elbe Lateral Canal, the bridge being combined with a barrier.

Near Lauenburg the B 209 crosses the Elbe, passes over the B 5 and runs finally into Schwarzenbek, where it meets the B 207 and B 404.

History 
To 1 July 1989 a section between Bad Fallingbostel and Soltau, part of the present day L 163 state road, was designated as Bundesstraße 209. As a result of the parallel routing of the A 7 autobahn, this section was downgraded however. In Bad Fallingbostel the autobahn slip road (then an independent branch) to the A 7 was designated the B 209a. When the road between Bad Fallingbostel and Soltau was downgraded on 1 July 1989 the slip road became part of the B 209. Its distance is separately measured however.

Route / Junctions

References 
 Informationsschreiben des Straßenbauamts Celle, Aktenzeichen 2221/31 322-L163 vom 19. April 2002

209
B 209
B 209